The 1930 FIFA World Cup was the inaugural FIFA World Cup, the world championship for men's national football teams. It took place in Uruguay from 13 to 30 July 1930. FIFA, football's international governing body, selected Uruguay as the host nation, as the country would be celebrating the centenary of its first constitution and the Uruguay national football team had successfully retained their football title at the 1928 Summer Olympics. All matches were played in the Uruguayan capital, Montevideo, the majority at the Estadio Centenario, which was built for the tournament.

Thirteen teams (seven from South America, four from Europe, and two from North America) entered the tournament. Only a few European teams chose to participate because of the difficulty of traveling to South America due to an economic crisis. The teams were divided into four groups, with the winner of each group progressing to the semi-finals. The first two World Cup matches took place simultaneously and were won by France and the United States, who defeated Mexico 4–1 and Belgium 3–0, respectively. Lucien Laurent of France scored the first goal in World Cup history, while United States goalkeeper Jimmy Douglas posted the first clean sheet in the tournament the same day.

Argentina, Uruguay, the United States, and Yugoslavia won their respective groups to qualify for the semi-finals. In the final, hosts and pre-tournament favourites Uruguay defeated Argentina 4–2 in front of 68,346 people to become the first nation to win the World Cup.

Participants
FIFA, the governing body of world football, had been discussing the creation of a competition for national teams for several years prior to 1930. The organisation had managed the football segment of the Summer Olympics on behalf of the International Olympic Committee since the early 20th century and the success of the competition at the 1924 and 1928 Olympic Games led to the formation of the FIFA World Cup. At the 17th FIFA congress, held in Amsterdam in May 1928, the competition was proposed by president Jules Rimet and accepted by the organisation's board, with vice-president Henri Delaunay proclaiming "international football can no longer be held within the confines of the Olympics".

The first World Cup was the only one without qualification. Every country affiliated with FIFA was invited to compete and given a deadline of 28 February 1930 to accept. The competition was originally planned as a 16-team knockout tournament with a potential second division if enough teams entered, however, the number of teams failed to reach 16, so there were no qualifications. Plenty of interest was shown by nations in the Americas; Argentina, Brazil, Bolivia, Chile, Mexico, Paraguay, Peru and the United States all entered. A total of seven South American teams participated, more than in any subsequent World Cup Finals. However, because of the long, costly trip by ship across the Atlantic Ocean and the length of absence required for players, very few European teams were inclined to take part due to an ongoing economic crisis. Some refused to countenance travel to South America in any circumstances, and no European entries were received before the February deadline. In an attempt to gain some European participation, the Uruguayan Football Association sent a letter of invitation to The Football Association, even though the British Home Nations (England, Northern Ireland, Scotland and Wales) had resigned from FIFA at the time. This was rejected by the FA Committee on 18 November 1929. Two teams from Asia (Japan and Siam – modern-day Thailand) withdrew, while Egypt, the lone African team to enter, was delayed due to a storm in the Mediterranean, and missed the ship travelling to Uruguay.

Two months before the start of the tournament, no team from Europe had officially entered. FIFA president Rimet intervened and four European teams eventually made the trip by sea: Belgium, France, Romania and Yugoslavia. The Romanians, managed by Constantin Rădulescu and coached by their captain Rudolf Wetzer and Octav Luchide, entered the competition following the intervention of the newly crowned King Carol II. He selected the squad personally and negotiated with employers to ensure that the players would still have jobs upon their return. The French entered at the personal intervention of Rimet, but neither France's star defender Manuel Anatol nor the team's regular coach Gaston Barreau could be persuaded to make the trip. The Belgians participated at the instigation of German-Belgian FIFA vice-president Rodolphe Seeldrayers.

The Romanians boarded the SS Conte Verde at Genoa, Italy; the French and Yugoslavs were picked up at Villefranche-sur-Mer, France, on 21 June 1930; and the Belgians embarked at Barcelona, Spain. The Conte Verde carried Rimet, the trophy and the three designated European referees: Belgians John Langenus and Henri Christophe, along with Thomas Balvay, a Parisian who may have been English. The Brazilian team were picked up when the boat docked in Rio de Janeiro on 29 June before arriving in Uruguay on 4 July. The official ball used for the tournament was the T-Model.

List of invited teams

The following 16 teams originally qualified for the final tournament. However, 13 teams participated due to the withdrawal of Egypt, Japan, and Siam.

  
  
  
  
  
  Egypt (missed ship)
  
  Japan (withdrew)

  
  
  
  
  Siam (withdrew)
  
  (hosts)

Venues

Italy, Sweden, the Netherlands, Spain, Hungary, and Uruguay all lodged applications to host the event. Uruguay's bid became the clear selection after all the other countries withdrew their bids. 

All matches took place in Montevideo. Three stadiums were used: Estadio Centenario, Estadio Pocitos, and Estadio Gran Parque Central. The Estadio Centenario was built both for the tournament and as a celebration of the centenary of Uruguayan independence. Designed by Juan Scasso, it was the primary stadium for the tournament, referred to by Rimet as a "temple of football". With a capacity of 90,000, it was the largest football stadium outside the British Isles. The stadium hosted 10 of the 18 matches, including both semi-finals and the final. However, a rushed construction schedule and delays caused by the rainy season meant the Centenario was not ready for use until five days into the tournament. Early matches were played at smaller stadiums usually used by Montevideo football clubs Nacional and Peñarol, the 20,000 capacity Gran Parque Central and the Pocitos.

Match officials
Fifteen referees participated in the tournament: four Europeans – two Belgians (Henri Christophe and John Langenus), a Frenchman (Thomas Balvay) and a Romanian (Constantin Rădulescu, also the Romanian team coach), and eleven from the Americas – among them six Uruguayans. To eliminate differences in the application of the Laws of the Game, the referees were invited to one short meeting to iron out the most conflicting issues that could arise.

Of all the refereeing appointments, the two that attracted the most attention were that of Gilberto de Almeida Rêgo in the match between Argentina and France, in which the Brazilian referee blew for full-time six minutes early, and that of the Bolivian Ulises Saucedo's Argentina and Mexico encounter, which Argentina won 6–3. During the game, Saucedo, who was also the coach of Bolivia, awarded three penalties.

The following is the list of officials to serve as referees and linesmen. Officials in italics were only employed as linesmen during the tournament.

Europe
 Thomas Balvay
 Henri Christophe
 John Langenus
 Constantin Rădulescu

North America
 Gaspar Vallejo

South America
 Gualberto Alonso
 Martin Aphesteguy
 Domingo Lombardi
 José Macías
 Francisco Mateucci
 Almeida Rêgo

 Ulises Saucedo
 Anibal Tejada
 Ricardó Vallarino
 Álberto Warnken

Format and draw
The 13 teams were drawn into four groups, with Group 1 containing four teams and the others containing three. Each group played a round-robin format, with the four group winners progressing to the knockout semi-final stage.

Uruguay, Argentina, Brazil, and the United States were seeded and kept apart in the draw; which took place in Montevideo once all the teams arrived.

Since there were no qualifying games, the opening two matches of the tournament were the first World Cup games ever played, taking place simultaneously on 13 July 1930; France beat Mexico 4–1 at the Estadio Pocitos, while the United States defeated Belgium 3–0 at the same time at the Estadio Gran Parque Central. France's Lucien Laurent was the scorer of the first World Cup goal.

Tournament summary

Group 1

The first group was the only one to contain four teams: Argentina, Chile, France, and Mexico. Two days after France's victory over Mexico, they faced group favourites Argentina. Injuries hindered France; goalkeeper Alex Thépot had to leave the field after 20 minutes and Laurent, after a fierce tackle by Luis Monti, spent most of the match limping. However, they held out for most of the match, only succumbing to an 81st-minute goal scored from a Monti free kick. The game featured an officiating controversy when referee Almeida Rêgo erroneously blew the final whistle six minutes early, with Frenchman Marcel Langiller clear on goal; play resumed only after protests from the French players. Although France had played twice in 48 hours, Chile had yet to play their first match. They faced Mexico the following day, gaining a comfortable 3–0 win.

France's final match, against Chile, featured the first penalty kick of the World Cup. The first goalkeeper to save a penalty was Thépot of France on 19 July 1930, saving from Chile's Carlos Vidal in the 30th minute of the match. In Argentina's second match, against Mexico, three penalty kicks were awarded. During the same match on 19 July 1930, Mexico's Óscar Bonfiglio saved another penalty in the 23rd minute of the match against Argentina's Fernando Paternoster. Guillermo Stábile scored a hat-trick in his international debut as Argentina won 6–3, despite the absence of their captain Manuel Ferreira, who had returned to Buenos Aires to take a law exam. Qualification was decided by the group's final match, contested by Argentina and Chile, who had beaten France and Mexico, respectively. The game was marred by a brawl sparked by a foul on Arturo Torres by Monti. Argentina won 3–1 against their neighbours and advanced to the semi-finals.

Group 2
The second group contained Brazil, Bolivia, and Yugoslavia. Brazil, the group seeds, were expected to progress, but in the group's opening match, unexpectedly lost 2–1 to Yugoslavia. Going into the tournament Bolivia had never previously won an international match. For their opener they paid tribute to the hosts by wearing shirts each emblazoned with a single letter, spelling "Viva Uruguay" as the team lined up. Both of Bolivia's matches followed a similar pattern, a promising start gradually transformed into heavy defeat. Against Yugoslavia, they held out for an hour before conceding but were four goals down by the final whistle. Misfortune played its part; several Bolivian goals were disallowed. Against Brazil, when both teams had only pride to play for, the score was 1–0 to Brazil at half-time. Brazil added three more in the second half, two of them scored by the multi-sportsman Preguinho. Yugoslavia qualified for the semi-finals.

Group 3
Hosts Uruguay was in a group with Peru and Romania. The opening match in this group saw the first player expulsion from the competition when Plácido Galindo of Peru was sent off against Romania. The Romanians made their man advantage pay; their 3–1 win included two late goals and the fastest goal of the tournament; Adalbert Deșu opened the scoring after just 50 seconds. This match had the smallest crowd of any in World Cup history. The official attendance was 2,459, but the actual figure is generally accepted to be around 300.

Due to construction delays at Estadio Centenario, Uruguay's first match was not played until five days into the tournament. The first to be held at the Centenario, it was preceded by a ceremony in honour of the Uruguayan centenary celebrations. The Uruguayan team spent the four weeks preceding the match in a training camp, at which strict discipline was exercised. Goalkeeper Andrés Mazali was dropped from the squad for breaking a curfew to visit his wife. One hundred years from the day of the creation of Uruguay's first constitution, the hosts won a tight match against Peru. The result was viewed as a poor performance by the Uruguayan press. performance of the Peruvian goalkeeper Jorge Pardon drew particular praise from neutral observers. Uruguay subsequently defeated Romania with ease, scoring four first-half goals to win 4–0.

Group 4
The fourth group contained Belgium, Paraguay, and the United States. The American team, which contained a significant number of new caps, were reputedly nicknamed "the shot-putters" by an unnamed source in the French contingent. They beat their first opponent, Belgium, 3–0. Both sides struggled early on due to heavy rain and snowfall before the U.S. took control. Belgian reports bemoaned the state of the pitch and refereeing decisions, claiming that the second goal was offside. The group's second match, played in windy conditions, witnessed the first tournament hat-trick, scored by Bert Patenaude of the United States against Paraguay. Until 10 November 2006, the first hat-trick that FIFA acknowledged had been scored by Stábile of Argentina, two days after Patenaude; however, in 2006 FIFA announced that Patenaude's claim to being the first hat-trick scorer was valid, as a goal previously assigned to teammate Tom Florie was reattributed to Patenaude. With the United States having secured qualification, the final match in the group was a dead rubber. Paraguay beat Belgium by a 1–0 margin.

Semi-finals
The four group winners, Argentina, Yugoslavia, Uruguay and the United States, moved to the semi-finals. The two semi-final matches saw identical scores. The first semi-final was played between the United States and Argentina on a rain-drenched pitch. The United States team, which featured six British-born players, lost midfielder Raphael Tracey after 10 minutes to a broken leg as the match became violent. A Monti goal halfway through the first half gave Argentina a 1–0 half-time lead. In the second half, the strength of the United States team was overwhelmed by the pace of the Argentinian attacks, the match finishing 6–1 to Argentina.

In the second semi-final, there were shades of the 1924 Summer Olympics match between Yugoslavia and Uruguay. Here, though, Yugoslavia took a surprise lead through Đorđe Vujadinović. Uruguay then took a 2–1 lead. Then shortly before half-time, Yugoslavia had a goal disallowed by a controversial offside decision. The hosts scored three more in the second half to win 6–1, Pedro Cea completing a hat-trick.

Third and fourth place
The now-traditional third-place play-off was not established until 1934, so the format of the 1930 World Cup is unique in not distinguishing between the third and fourth-placed teams. Occasional sources, notably a FIFA Bulletin from 1984, incorrectly imply that a third-place match occurred and was won 3–1 by Yugoslavia. Accounts differ as to whether a third-place match was originally scheduled. According to a 2009 book by Hyder Jawad, Yugoslavia refused to play a third-place match because they were upset with the refereeing in their semi-final against Uruguay.

At the end of the championship, the captains of the United States team (Tom Florie) and Yugoslavia (Milutin Ivković) both received bronze medals. Yet a FIFA technical committee report on the 1986 World Cup included full retrospective rankings of all teams at all previous World Cup finals; this report ranked the United States third and Yugoslavia fourth, due to a better goal difference on otherwise identical records, a practice since continued by FIFA. In 2010, the son of Kosta Hadži, the chief of the Yugoslav delegation at the 1930 World Cup and the vice-president of the Football Association of Yugoslavia at the time, claimed that Yugoslavia, as a team, has been awarded one bronze medal, which has been kept by Hadži himself and his family for the following 80 years. According to this source, Yugoslavia was placed third because of the semi-final loss to the eventual champions, Uruguay. The official recording however shows the United States team claiming third place.

The Yugoslavia team achieved the joint–biggest success in both Yugoslav and Serbian subsequent World Cup footballing history, by earning fourth place, a result that would be repeated in 1962.

Final

The resounding wins for Uruguay and Argentina in the semi-finals meant the final was a repeat of the matchup in the 1928 Olympic final, which Uruguay had won 2–1 after a replay.

The final was played at the Estadio Centenario on 30 July. Feelings ran high around the La Plata Basin as the Argentine supporters crossed the river with the war cry Victoria o muerte ("victory or death"), dispelling any uncertainty as to whether the tournament had captured the imagination of the public. The ten boats earmarked to carry Argentine fans from Buenos Aires to Montevideo proved inadequate, and any number of assorted craft attempted the crossing. An estimated 10–15,000 Argentinians made the trip, but the port at Montevideo was so overwhelmed that many did not even make landfall before kick-off, let alone reach the stadium. At the stadium, supporters were searched for weapons. The gates were opened at eight o'clock, six hours before kick-off, and by noon the ground was full, with an official attendance of 93,000. A disagreement overshadowed the build-up to the match as the teams failed to agree on who should provide the match ball, forcing FIFA to intervene and decree that the Argentine team would provide the ball for the first half and the Uruguayans would provide their own for the second. Uruguay made one change from their semi-final line-up. Castro replaced Anselmo, who missed out due to illness. Monti played for Argentina despite receiving death threats on the eve of the match. The referee was Belgian John Langenus, who only agreed to officiate a few hours before the game, having sought assurances for his safety. One of his requests was for a boat to be ready at the harbour within one hour of the final whistle, in case he needed to make a quick escape.

The hosts scored the opening goal through Pablo Dorado, a low shot from a position on the right. Argentina, displaying superior passing ability, responded strongly. Within eight minutes they were back on level terms; Carlos Peucelle received a Ferreira through-ball, beat his marker and equalised. Shortly before half-time leading tournament goalscorer Guillermo Stábile gave Argentina a 2–1 lead. Uruguay captain Nasazzi protested, maintaining that Stábile was offside but to no avail. In the second half Uruguay gradually became ascendant. Shortly after Stábile missed a chance to make the score 3–1, Uruguay attacked in numbers and Pedro Cea scored an equaliser. Ten minutes later, a goal by Santos Iriarte gave Uruguay the lead, and just before full-time Castro made it 4–2 to seal the win. Langenus ended the match a minute later and Uruguay added the title of World Cup winner to their mantle of Olympic champions. Jules Rimet presented the World Cup Trophy, which was later named for him, to the head of the Uruguayan Football Association, Raúl Jude. The following day was declared a national holiday in Uruguay; in the Argentinian capital, Buenos Aires, a mob threw stones at the Uruguayan consulate. Francisco Varallo (who played as a forward for Argentina) was the last player in the final to die, on 30 August 2010.

France, Yugoslavia and the United States all played friendlies in South America following the competition. Brazil played France on 1 August, Yugoslavia on 10 August and the United States on 17 August, while Argentina hosted Yugoslavia on 3 August.

Uruguay's aggregate goal difference of +12 over four games, at an average of +3 per match, remains the highest average goal difference per match of any World Cup champion and the second-highest of any World Cup finals participant, after Hungary in 1954.

Group stage

Group 1

Group 2

Group 3

Group 4

Knockout stage

Bracket

Semi-finals

Final

Goalscorers

Source=

FIFA retrospective ranking
In 1986, FIFA published a report that ranked all teams in each World Cup up to and including 1986, based on progress in the competition, overall results and quality of the opposition. The rankings for the 1930 tournament were as follows:

See also

See You in Montevideo: 2014 Serbian film recreating the tournament from the point of view of the Yugoslav team

Notes

References

Bibliography

External links

1930 FIFA World Cup Uruguay , FIFA.com
1930 FIFA World Cup at RSSSF.com

 
World
1930 in Uruguayan football
FIFA World Cup tournaments
International association football competitions hosted by Uruguay
World Cup
July 1930 sports events
1930s in Montevideo
Sports competitions in Montevideo